Seconda Divisione 1922–23 was the lower championship of the Lega Nord.

Differently from the higher championship, it was structured on six local groups.

Teams 
All clubs of former Prima Categoria which did not get a place for the new Prima Divisione, together with the regional champions of former Promozione and CCI local tournaments.

Regulations 
Six group of eight clubs, fourteen matchdays. Finals for the title.

No promotions for this year following the agreement between
FIGC and Northern League about the reduction of the First Division.

Two relegations for each group and a test-matches for the six placed teams against best Third Division clubs.

Group A 
Sestrese 22
Vado 19
Spes Genoa 16
Pavia 12
Quarto 12
Entella 11
Casteggio 10
OEM 10

Casteggio and OEM relegated. OEM then went bankrupt. Entella lost test-match against Veloci Embriaci and relegated.

Group B 
Biellese 22
Valenzana 21
Saronno 17
Vercellesi Erranti 16
Pro Patria 14
Varese 10
Sestese 7
Luinese 6

Sestese and Luinese relegated. Luinese then went bankrupt.

Group C 
Atalanta 20
Piacenza 19
Juve Italia 17
Como 16
Fanfulla 16
Monza 11
Chiasso 11
Officine 6

Chiasso and Officine relegated. Chiasso left FIGC to ASF.

Group D 
Carpi 25
Trevigliese 17
Parma 16
Legnanese 15
Bentegodi 13
Ostiglia 10
Schio 8
Mantovana 8

Schio and Mantovana relegated.

Group E 
Edera Pola 20
Dolo 17
Monfalcone 16
Treviso 14
Venezia 14
Grion Pola 13
Vicenza 13
Giorgione 5

Vicenza and Giorgione relegated. Grion Pola lost test-match against Olympia Fiume and relegated.

Group F 
Viareggio 24
Libertas 20
Prato 19
Reggiana 17
CS Firenze 16
Siena 12
Fortitudo Bologna 7
Juve Massa 0

Fortitudo Bologna and Juve Massa relegated. Juve Massa then took a year-break.

Title finals
Biellese and Carpi won semifinals. Biellese won the title.

References 

1922–23 in Italian football leagues

Serie B seasons